is a Japanese voice actor and singer from Kanagawa Prefecture attached to Ken Production. Formerly a child actor attached to Gekidan Himawari, he mainly specializes in dubbing roles. He is vocalist of Screen Mode, a band signed with Lantis.

Biography

Filmography

Television animation
Ultra Maniac (2003) (Yuta Kirishima)
Get Ride! AM Driver (2005) (Hans)
Big Windup! (2007) (Toshihiko Maekawa)
Stitch! (2009) (Tetsuo)
JoJo's Bizarre Adventure: Battle Tendency (2012) (Smokey Brown)
Haikyū!! (2014) (Ryūnosuke Tanaka)
Love Stage!! (2014) (Saotome-sensei)
Kuroko's Basketball (2015) (Shigehiro Ogiwara)
Haikyū!! Season 2 (2015) (Ryūnosuke Tanaka)
Big Order (2016) (Ayahito Sundan)
Bungo Stray Dogs (2016) (Tachihara Michizō)
Cheer Boys!! (2016) (Kōji Tōno)
Mob Psycho 100 (2016) (Tsuyoshi Edano)
Haikyū!! Season 3 (2016) (Ryūnosuke Tanaka)
Banana Fish (2018) (Abraham Dawson)
Muhyo & Roji's Bureau of Supernatural Investigation (2018-2020) (Jirō "Roji" Kusano)
YU-NO: A Girl Who Chants Love at the Bound of this World (2019) (Takuya Arima)
Haikyū!! TO THE TOP (2020) (Ryūnosuke Tanaka)
Jujutsu Kaisen (2020) (Ino Takuma) 
Tokyo Revengers (2021) (Manjirō "Mikey" Sano)
Vinland Saga Season 2 (2023) (Olmar)
Yu-Gi-Oh! Go Rush!! (2023) (Tremolo Ryugu)

Theatrical animation
Memories (1995) (The Boy)
Mobile Suit Gundam: Cucuruz Doan's Island (2022) (Danan Rashica)

Video games
Heart of Darkness (xxxx) (Andy)
Imabikisō (xxxx) (Hiroki Makimura)
Kingdom Hearts II (xxxx) (Peter Pan)
Kingdom Hearts Birth by Sleep (xxxx) (Peter Pan)
Kingdom Hearts RE:Chain of Memories (xxxx) (Peter Pan)
Final Fantasy Type-0 (2011) (Enra)
Octopath Traveler II (2023) (Ritsu)
Zenless Zone Zero (TBD) (Billy Kid)

Dubbing roles

Live-action
Shia LaBeouf
Even Stevens (Louis Anthony Stevens)
The Nightmare Room (Dylan Pierce) (Episode 2: "Scareful What You Wish For")
Holes (Stanley Yelnats) 
Disturbia (Kale Brecht)
Alvin and the Chipmunks (Theodore) (Replacing Jesse McCartney's voice)
Alvin and the Chipmunks: The Squeakquel (Theodore) (Replacing Jesse McCartney's voice)
Alvin and the Chipmunks: Chipwrecked (Theodore) (Replacing Jesse McCartney's voice)
Alvin and the Chipmunks: The Road Chip (Theodore)
The Amityville Horror (Billy Lutz (Jesse James))
Beethoven (Ted Newton (Christopher Castile))
Cory in the House (Newton "Newt" Livingston III (Jason Dolley))
E.T. the Extra-Terrestrial (2002 DVD edition) (Michael (Robert MacNaughton))
Fun Size (Roosevelt Leroux (Thomas Mann))
Gentlemen Broncos (Benjamin Purvis (Michael Angarano))
Good Luck Charlie (PJ Duncan (Jason Dolley))
Home Alone 2: Lost in New York (TV Asahi edition) (Kevin McCallister (Macaulay Culkin))
Justin Bieber: Never Say Never (Justin Bieber)
Kindergarten Cop (1995 TV Asahi edition) (Dominic (Christian and Joseph Cousins))
My Girl (TV Asahi edition) (Thomas J. Sennett (Macaulay Culkin))
My Soul to Take (Alex Dunkelman (John Magaro))
Okja (Jay (Paul Dano))
Overlord (Private First Class Lyle Tibbet (John Magaro))
Percy Jackson & the Olympians: The Lightning Thief (Grover Underwood (Brandon T. Jackson))
Percy Jackson: Sea of Monsters (Grover Underwood (Brandon T. Jackson))
The Perks of Being a Wallflower (Charlie Kelmeckis (Logan Lerman))
The Purge (Charlie Sandin (Max Burkholder))
Shazam! (2021 THE CINEMA edition) (Billy Batson (Asher Angel))
Smallville (Pete Ross (Sam Jones III))
A Thousand Words (Aaron Wiseberger (Clark Duke))
Yogi Bear (Boo-Boo Bear (Justin Timberlake))

Animation
 101 Dalmatian Street (Dylan)
 Bambi (Young Bambi)
 Disney's House of Mouse (Peter Pan)
 The Little Mermaid II: Return to the Sea (Handsome Boy)
 The New Adventures of Winnie the Pooh (Christopher Robin)
 Rated A for Awesome (Lester "Les" Awesome)
 Return to Never Land (Peter Pan)
 Sausage Party (Barry)
 South Park (Kyle Broflovski (FOX dub) (Matt Stone))
 Steven Universe (Steven)

Japanese Voice-Over
 Peter Pan's Flight (Peter Pan)

References

External links
Ken Production profile

1983 births
Living people
Japanese male pop singers
Japanese male video game actors
Japanese male voice actors
Ken Production voice actors
Male voice actors from Kanagawa Prefecture
Musicians from Kanagawa Prefecture
People from Zama, Kanagawa
20th-century Japanese male actors
21st-century Japanese male actors
21st-century Japanese singers
21st-century Japanese male singers